Achadh Eochaille is the Irish-language name for:

 Ahoghill, a large village in County Antrim, Northern Ireland
 Ahiohill, a small village in County Cork, Ireland